West Caister is a village and civil parish in the English county of Norfolk.

For the purposes of local government, the parish falls within the district of Great Yarmouth.

West Caister is the site of Caister Castle, a 15th-century moated castle built by Sir John Fastolf, who was the inspiration for William Shakespeare's Falstaff. The great Thomas Ward lived much of his life there adjacent to the main part of the village next to its close neighbour Ormesby St Margaret".

Notes

External links

.

Villages in Norfolk
Civil parishes in Norfolk
Borough of Great Yarmouth